is a Japanese manga series written and illustrated by Kouji Mori. It was serialized in Kodansha's seinen manga magazine Evening from March 2017 to January 2023, with its chapters collected in ten tankōbon volumes as of September 2022. A second part is set to start in Hakusensha's Young Animal in March 2023.

Publication
Kodansha has collected its chapters into individual tankōbon volumes. The first volume was released on August 23, 2017. As of September 22, 2022, ten volumes have been released.

A second part is set to start in Hakusensha's seinen manga magazine Young Animal on March 24, 2023.

The manga is licensed in France by Vega-Dupuis.

Volume list

References

External links
  

Hakusensha manga
Kodansha manga
Science fiction anime and manga
Seinen manga
Survival anime and manga